This is a list of television programs broadcast by Boomerang in the UK and Ireland.

Current programming 

 Be Cool, Scooby-Doo! (5 October 2015 - present)
 Ben 10 (23 September 2017 - 2017;2021 - 2022;2022 - present)
 Grizzy and the Lemmings (10 October 2016 - present) (also airs on Pop Max)
 Lego Monkie Kid (4 February 2023 - present) (also airs on CITV)
 Looney Tunes (27 May 2000 - 2018;2022 - present)
 Looney Tunes Cartoons (7 June - 6 September 2021;1 November 2021 - 31 January 2022;2022 - present)
 Moley (4 October 2021 - present) (Formerly on POP)
 Mr. Bean: The Animated Series (2010 - present) (also airs on CITV)
 Mush-Mush & The Mushables (1 March 2021 - 1 March 2022;2022 - present) (also airs on Tiny Pop)
 New Looney Tunes  (2 November 2015 - 2020;2022 - present)
 Ninjago: Masters of Spinjitzu (22 August 2022 - present) (Formerly on CITV)
 Scooby-Doo and Guess Who? (7 October 2019 - present)
 Scooby-Doo! Mystery Incorporated (6 September 2010 - 2021;2022 - present)
 Tom and Jerry (27 May 2000 - 2021;2022 - present)
 Tom and Jerry in New York (1 November 2021 - present)
 Tom and Jerry Tales (6 November 2006 - present)
 The New Scooby-Doo Movies (27 May 2000 - 2018;2022 - present)
 The Looney Tunes Show (2011 - 2021;2022 - present)
 The Tom and Jerry Show (12 April 2014 - 2021;2022 - present)
 What's New, Scooby-Doo? (7 April 2003 - present)

Former programming 

 The 13 Ghosts of Scooby-Doo
 The Addams Family 
 The Addams Family 
 The Adventures of Puss in Boots 
 The Amazing Adrenalini Brothers
 The Amazing World of Gumball
 Animaniacs (original series) 
 Atom Ant
 Baby Looney Tunes
 The Banana Splits
 Bananas in Pyjamas
 Best Ed
 Blue Water High
 The Boss Baby: Back in Business (2 March 2020 - 2 April 2021;2022)
 Bunnicula
 Camp Lazlo 
 Captain Caveman and the Teen Angels
 Casper's Scare School
 Challenge of the GoBots 
 The Charlie Brown and Snoopy Show 
 Chowder 
 Cow and Chicken
 Count Duckula
 The Cramp Twins
 Danger Mouse
 Dastardly and Muttley in Their Flying Machines
 Dexter's Laboratory 
 Dink the Little Dinosaur 
 Doraemon
 Dorothy and the Wizard of Oz 
 DreamWorks Dragons 
 Droopy
 Duck Dodgers
 Dynomutt 
 Fangface
 The Flintstones
 Foster's Home for Imaginary Friends(2006-2017?)
 Fraggle Rock
 Frankenstein Jr. and The Impossibles 
 Gadget Boy
 Galaxy Goof-Ups 
 Garfield and Friends
 The Garfield Show (2 November 2009-2020)
 The Gary Coleman Show
 George of the Jungle (2007 TV series) (2 November 2009–2020) 
 Great Grape Ape
 Firehouse Tales
 The Happos Family
 Help!... It's the Hair Bear Bunch!
 The Hillbilly Bears
 Hong Kong Phooey
 Huckleberry Hound
 Inch High, Private Eye
 Inspector Gadget (original series) 
 Inspector Gadget (2015 reboot)
 Jabberjaw
 Jelly Jamm
 The Jetsons
 Johnny Bravo
 Jonny Quest 
 Josie and the Pussycats
 Josie and the Pussycats in Outer Space 
 The Jungle Bunch
 King Arthur's Disasters 
 Kingdom Force 
 Krypto the Superdog
 Laff-A-Lympics
 The Land Before Time
 Lamput
 The Latest Buzz
 LazyTown
 Life With Derek
 The Magic Roundabout
 Magilla Gorilla
 Make Shake & Jake
 Masha and the Bear
 Master Moley by Royal Invitation (TV special) 
 Mighty Mike
 Mr. Bean (live action)
 My Little Pony: Friendship is Magic 
 My Spy Family
 The New Yogi Bear Show
 Oddbods 
 The Owl & Co
 The Perils of Penelope Pitstop
 The Pink Panther 
 Pink Panther & Pals
 The Pink Panther Show
 Pat the Dog 
 Pixie and Dixie
 Popeye
 Pororo the Little Penguin
 Pound Puppies
 The Powerpuff Girls (original series) 
 The Powerpuff Girls (2016 reboot)
 Puppy in My Pocket: Adventures in Pocketville 
 Quick Draw McGraw 
 The Raccoons 
 Roobarb and Custard 
 Scooby-Doo and Scrappy-Doo
 Scooby-Doo and Scrappy-Doo
 The Scooby-Doo Show
 Scooby-Doo, Where Are You!
 Shaggy & Scooby-Doo Get a Clue!
 Secret Squirrel 
 Sitting Ducks
 Skatoony
 The Smurfs
 The Snorks 
 Sonic Boom
 Space Ghost
 Spaced Out 
 Strawberry Shortcake's Berry Bitty Adventures
 The New Scooby Doo Mysteries
 The Sylvester & Tweety Mysteries
 Taffy (7 January 2019 - 2022) (now on CBBC)
 Talking Tom and Friends
 The Tex Avery Show 
 Thunderbirds
 Tiny Toon Adventures
 Tom & Jerry Kids
 Top Cat
 Touché Turtle and Dum Dum 
 Wacky Races (original series)
 Wacky Races (reboot series) 
 Wally Gator
 Yabba-Dabba Dinosaurs
 Yogi Bear 
 Yogi's Gang 
 Yogi's Space Race
 Yogi's Treasure Hunt
 The ZhuZhus

References

Boomerang (TV network)
British television-related lists
Boomerang
Boomerang
Cartoon Network-related lists
Warner Bros. Discovery EMEA